Tyurin is a Russian masculine surname, its feminine counterpart is Tyurina. It may refer to

 Anatoly Tyurin (born 1968), Russian canoer
 Denis Tyurin (born 1980), Russian ice hockey player
 Galina Tyurina (1938–1970), Soviet mathematician
 Lyubov Tyurina (1943–2015), Russian volleyball player 
 Mikhail Tyurin (born 1960), Russian cosmonaut
 Oleg Tyurin (1937–2010), Russian rower
 Platon Tyurin (1816–1882), Russian painter
 Vadim Tyurin (born 1971), Russian football player
 Yelena Tyurina (born 1971), Russian volleyball player 
 Yevgraph Tyurin (c.1793–1875), Russian architect and art collector

Russian-language surnames